Lost in Woonsocket is a documentary feature film directed by John Chester.  It stars Chester and Andre Miller, co-creators of the A&E Network documentary series Random 1, from which the film draws much of its content.  It concerns Mark and Normand, characters featured in episodes 4 and 10 of Random 1's single season, and their attempts to stay sober after being brought out of destitution by Chester, Miller, and the Random 1 organization.  Though Random 1 was not renewed after its season finale, Chester and Miller continued filming Mark and Normand in their hometown of Woonsocket, RI, and this new footage makes up the final third of the film.

It premiered at the South by Southwest film festival in 2007.

External links
 Lost and Found in America, a non-profit set up around the film
 Random One's website
 Time Out review of Lost In Woonsocket
 

American documentary films
Documentary films about television
2000s English-language films
2000s American films